Colegio El Roble may refer to:
Colegio El Roble Interlomas - State of Mexico
Colegio El Roble Arica (Chile)
Colegio El Roble de Santo Domingo (Santo Domingo, Región de Valparaíso, Chile)
Colegio El Roble Ñuñoa (Ñuñoa, Santiago de Chile, Chile)